Yu Shaoliang (born 26 July 1964) is a Chinese editor and politician who is the current chief editor of People's Daily, in office since February 2022. He is an alternate member of the 19th Central Committee of the Chinese Communist Party.

Early life and education
Yu was born in Zanhuang County, Hebei, on 26 July 1964. After resuming the college entrance examination in 1980, he was accepted to Hebei University, majoring in Chinese language and literature.

Career in Xinhua News Agency
After graduating in 1984, he was assigned to the Hebei Branch of Xinhua News Agency as a journalist. He was promoted to vice president of the Shaanxi Branch of Xinhua News Agency in July 1999, and was promoted again to the president position in September 2004. He was director of the General Office of Xinhua News Agency in December 2008, and held that office until May 2010, when he was appointed director of its Personnel Bureau. He also served as vice president of Xinhua News Agency since July 2014.

Career in Hubei
He was appointed head of Organization Department and president of Provincial Party School in February 2016 and was admitted to member of the Standing Committee of the CCP Hubei Provincial Committee, the province's top authority.

Career in Shanghai
In June 2018, he was transferred to Shanghai and being assigned to the similar position there. He concurrently served as deputy party secretary of Shanghai and secretary of Shanghai Municipal Political and Legal Affairs Commission.

Career in People's Daily
On 26 February 2022, he was appointed chief editor of People's Daily, succeeding Tuo Zhen.

References

1964 births
Living people
People from Zanhuang County
Hebei University alumni
Central Party School of the Chinese Communist Party alumni
People's Republic of China politicians from Hebei
Chinese Communist Party politicians from Hebei
Alternate members of the 19th Central Committee of the Chinese Communist Party